Dade County can refer to the following places:

Miami-Dade County, Florida, in the southeastern part of the state
Dade County, Georgia, the state's northwesternmost, bordering Alabama and Tennessee
Dade County, Missouri, in the southwestern part of the state